Dil Lagi (English: Feelings of the Heart) is a Pakistani romantic-drama television series, produced by Humayun Saeed and Shahzad Nasib under their production banner Six Sigma Plus. It is directed by Nadeem Baig and written by Faiza Iftikhar. It features Humayun Saeed and Mehwish Hayat in lead roles. The serial aired on ARY Digital on 5 March 2016. The series was well received and critically acclaimed. At 16th Lux Style Awards, it received four nominations with winning an award of Best TV Play.

Plot 
Dillagi is romantic story of Mohid (Humayun Saeed)and Anmol (Mehwish Hayat). It is set in the narrow back streets of Sukkur in interior Sindh, where Anmol lives a simple life with her mother and younger sister Mishal Ansari. Before he died, Anmol's father had paid off a debt he owed to local moneylender Kifayat Ali using his home as security, but Anmol's mother has no proof of the debt repayment so they are an easy mark for fraud. Kifayat Ali engages Mohid, who specializes in real-estate, and a little ghundagardi on the side to evict Anmol's family. The clash between Mohid and Anmol is the crux of this story.

Cast

Main cast 
 Humayun Saeed as Mohid; Anmol's husband; Zulekha's son and Sabiha's brother
 Mehwish Hayat as Anmol; Mohid's wife; Zulekha's daughter-in-law and Mishal's sister

Recurring cast 
 Saba Hameed As Zulekha; (Mohid and Sabiha's mother and Anmol's mother-in-law)
 Asma Abbas ( Mishal & Anmol's mother; Mohid's mother-in-law )
 Imran Ashraf as Dastagir; Mohid's assistant
 Mirza Zain Baig as Fazal; Sabiha's husband and Mohid's brother-in-law 
 Uzma Hassan as Sabiha; Mohid's sister; Fazal's wife and Zulekha's daughter
 Inayat Khan as Fareed; Anmol's lover
 Mariam Ansari as Mishal; Mohid's sister-in-law and Anmol's sister

Episodes

Soundtrack

The title song was sung by Rahat Fateh Ali Khan. The music was composed by Sahir Ali Bagga and the lyrics were written by Faiza Iftikhar.

Broadcast and availability 

The show was dubbed in Arabic under the title الحب المستحیل and is available as VOD on shahid.net. The show is also available on MX Player app. It was also aired on ARY Digital's sister channel ARY Zindagi.

Reception 
The series received acclaim due to its script, performances and stong female protagonist. The Nation praised the writing for breaking the gender stereotypes. DAWN Images praised the writing for the depiction of family values, women bonds and stong female protagonist, which was rare on television at that time. The misogynistic elements of the plotline were however criticized.

Awards and nominations

Lux Style Awards 
 Best Television Play-Won
 Best Television Director-Nadeem Beyg-Nominated
 Best Television Actor-Humayun Saeed-Nominated 
 Best Television Actress-Mehwish Hayat-Nominated 
 Best Television Writer-Faiza Iftikhar-Nominated

International Pakistan Prestigue Academy Awards
Nominations 
 Best TV Play-ARY Digital-Nominated 
 Best TV Director-Nadeem Baig-Nominated 
 Best TV Actor-Humayun Saeed-Winner
 Best TV Actress-Mehwish Hayat-Nominated 
 Best TV Supporting Actor/Actress-Saba Hameed-Nominated

ARY Social Media Awards
 Best Drama-Winner
 Best Actor-Humayun Saeed-Winner
 Best On-Screen Couple-Humayun Saeed & Mehwish Hayat-Winner
 Best Supporting Actor-Imran Ashraf-Winner
 Best Supporting Actress-Mariam Ansari-Winner
 Best Mother-Saba Hameed-Winner
 Best OST-Winner

References

External links
 Website

ARY Digital original programming
Pakistani drama television series
2016 Pakistani television series debuts
2016 Pakistani television series endings
Films directed by Nadeem Baig (director)